Abbas Fares (22 April 1902 – 13 February 1978) was an Egyptian film actor. He appeared in 26 films between 1929 and 1971.

Selected filmography
 A Night of Love (1951)
 The Monster (1954)
 The Poor Millionaire (1959)
 In Desert and Wilderness (1973)

External links

1902 births
1978 deaths
Egyptian male film actors
20th-century Egyptian male actors